State Route 54 is a short highway completely within the town of Mona in Juab County in northern Utah that connects Main Street (old US-91) to I-15 in a span of one mile (1.6 km).

Route description
From its western terminus, the highway veers to the northeast and steadies out to the east. It continues this direction before it ends at a cattle guard just east of its junction with I-15.

History
In 1971, the State Road Commission designated a new State Route 54, connecting proposed I-15 at exit 233 with Mona. In 1975, after I-15 was completed, old US-91 through Mona (then designated SR-41) was given back to the town and Juab County.

Major intersections

References

054
 054